Nueva Vida may refer to:

Places
Nueva Vida, Calakmul Municipality, Mexico
Nueva Vida, Pichilemu, Chile

Broadcasting
Radio Nueva Vida Christian radio network

Music
Nueva Vida, album by Las Chicas del Can
Nueva Vida, album by Sergio Dalma 2001
Nueva Vida, EP by Ojos de Brujo
"Nueva Vida", song by Ojos de Brujo

See also
Vida Nueva (disambiguation)